EVA International (previously known as Limerick Exhibition of Visual Art and e v + a) is a large-scale contemporary art exhibition that takes place every two years in the city of Limerick, Republic of Ireland. It is known as Ireland's biennial, and is held in even-numbered years.

History

The first incarnation of EVA International was The 77 Exhibition of Visual Art, created by the original committee with the mission statement of providing the public ‘with an opportunity to visit and experience an exhibition not normally available in the region and, at the same time, to stimulate an awareness of the visual arts here’. Between then and 2017, there have been 37 editions of the citywide exhibition.

Each edition is now curated by a different international curator of note, a practice that began with Sandy Nairne in 1979, the only  exception to the international rule being Paul O’Reilly, Irish curator of the 1998 edition. The exhibit now has an international focus to its programming, aiming to bring international art to Limerick whilst increasing Ireland's standing in the international art world through invited curators. EVA exhibits have taken place in a number of venues across the city, notably at the Limerick City Gallery of Art, The Hunt Museum, and King John's Castle. For each edition, artists are selected through an open call for submissions, beginning with the first exhibition in 1977. Between 1994 and 2010, the exhibit also included an ‘invited’ selection of artists in addition to those who responded to the open call for artists’ proposals.

Curator Matt Packer was named Director of EVA in March 2017.  Packer was previously the Director of CCA Centre For Contemporary Art Derry ~ Londonderry.

Changes in name
The name of the Limerick event has gone through several incarnations, with the original edition being known as the ‘77 Exhibition of Visual Art, Limerick’, the exhibit has variously been known as Exhibition of Visual Art, EVA, and e v + a. Following incorporation as a company limited by guarantee in 2012, the organisation has operated under the business name ‘EVA International’.

Young EVA
Young EVA is the organisation's flagship education programme. Beginning in 1984, this has taken a variety of forms, frequently involving artist-led workshops with school-age groups, often resulting in an exhibition of young participants’ work.

Platform Commissions 
Platform Commissions is a programme initiative started in 2018 by EVA International that focuses on the commission of works and projects by artists based in Ireland.

Editions

References

External links
 Official website

1977 establishments in Ireland
Recurring events established in 1977
Art exhibitions in Ireland
Art biennials
Events in the Republic of Ireland
Irish contemporary art
Culture in Limerick (city)